Zinc finger protein 202 is a transcription factor first associated with breast cancer. It is a protein that, in humans, is encoded by the ZNF202 gene.

Clinical significance 

Variants of this protein have been discovered to be strongly associated with coronary heart disease and atherosclerosis.

References

Further reading

External links 
 

Transcription factors
Oncology
Proteins